Attoor is a panchayat town in Kanniyakumari district  in the state of Tamil Nadu, India.

Demographics
 India census, Attoor had a population of 11,742.

References

Cities and towns in Kanyakumari district